The people from Apayao, Abra and Ilocos Norte believe in and fear a swamp creature called Berberoka. It lures victims by sucking all the water out of a pond so the fish lay dead on the ground. When come to pick up the fish, the Berberoka releases all the water and eats them as they struggle to stay afloat. Despite all their powers, these water ogres have a morbid, ironic fear of crabs.

They were compared to the Greek naiads, the nymphs of water elements. They have the ability to suck up all the water in a swamp or lake. Also, many elderly people believed that they use water to attack their enemies. They discharge a large amount of water (just like a fire hose) at their victims until they drown.

References

Visayan mythology
Philippine legendary creatures
Female legendary creatures